Jean-Sylvestre N'Keoua  (born 31 December 1979) is a Congolese former professional footballer who played as a midfielder.

N'Keoua played for Africa Sports National in the CAF Champions League 2000.

N'Keoua has made several appearances for the Republic of the Congo national football team, including qualifying matches for the 1998 and 2002 FIFA World Cup. He also played at the 2000 African Nations Cup.

References

1978 births
Living people
Association football midfielders
Republic of the Congo footballers
Republic of the Congo expatriate footballers
Republic of the Congo international footballers
2000 African Cup of Nations players
Africa Sports d'Abidjan players
MO Constantine players
Expatriate footballers in Ivory Coast
Expatriate footballers in Algeria